Danny Gay may refer to:

Danny Gay (politician) (born 1950), Canadian politician
Danny Gay (footballer) (born 1982), English footballer